Grandson of Morris On is a thematic album produced by Ashley Hutchings and others.

Twenty-six years after recording "Son Of Morris On", Hutchings put together an ensemble to play another selection of Morris dance tunes. Compared to previous efforts this is less electric, and more acoustic. As before there are real Morris sides (Adderbury, Stroud Morris and The Outside Capering Crew) dancing with their own musicians. Although many musicians appear in the credits, only two or three appear together on most tracks. The loud punchy tune "Le Halle Place" is probably the highlight of the album. Chris Leslie has recorded Morris dance albums in his own right. The liner notes were written just after the events of "9/11", and reflect a certain despair at the possibility of world war. Recorded 2001. Released on CD in 2002. Running time 55 minutes 12 seconds.

Track listing 

 The Blue-Eyed Stranger/ The Curly-Headed Ploughboy (Tune: Trad/Words: Ashley Hutchings)
 Le Halle Place (instr) (Chris Leslie)
 The Life of a Fool (Ashley Hutchings/Simon Care)
 The Quaker's Wife (spoken) (Trad)
 Shepherd's Hey/ Orange in Bloom/ The Quaker (instr) (Trad)
 Tom Long's Post (aka Three Jolly Sheepskins) (instr) (Trad)
 Jupiter's Return/ Bold Eric/ Tailor's Buttons (Dave Whetstone)
 Little Johnny England (Trad)
 Hi-ho-fiddle-dee-dee (spoken) (Trad)|
 Black Joke (instr) (Trad)
 Gloucester Hornpipe/ Mr Trill's Song (Trad/Ashley Hutchings - Bob Pegg)
 Sweet Jenny Jones (instr) (Trad)
 Horatio (instr) (Dave Whetstone)
 Garland Gay (Trad)
 Saturday Night / Bobbing Joe / Beaux Badby (instr) (Trad)
 He Sits There (spoken) (Maida Stanier)
 Glorishears (instr) (Trad)
 The Snake (aka Gypsy Hornpipe) (instr) (Trad)
 This Is The Morris My Friend (Ashley Hutchings - Simon Care)
 Four Up (Barry Goodman, arr. The Outside Capering Crew)
 Four Up - Reprise (Barry Goodman, arr. The Outside Capering Crew)

Personnel 
Chris Leslie - vocals, fiddle
Phil Beer - fiddle, vocals, mandolin, acoustic guitar
Simon Care - melodeon
Jon Moore - acoustic guitar
John Shepherd - piano
Martin Brinsford - tambourine, voice, triangle, mouth organ
Ric Sanders - synthesiser, baritone fiddle
Simon Nicol - acoustic 6 & 12 string guitars
Ashley Hutchings - electric bass, vocals
Adderbury Morris Men - morris dance bells
Neil Marshall - drums and percussion
Ken Nicol - electric and acoustic guitar
Mark Rogers - melodeon
Sharon Kilyon - melodeon
Dave Whetstone - melodeon and anglo concertina
Jim Walker - drums
Stephen Wass - melodeon
Stroud Morris Dancers - morris dance bells
John Shepherd - keyboards
Judy Dunlop - backing vocals
Blair Dunlop - backing vocals
Mick Twelves - backing vocals
The Outside Capering Crew - morris bells and 'verbals'
Barry Goodman - melodeon
Lawrence Wright - melodeon

Produced by Ashley Hutchings

2002 albums
Morris On albums